Vice Admiral Ko Tun-hwa (18 September 1921; Fuzhou – 12 June 2010, Taipei) was a geostrategist, former Vice Minister of Defense of Taiwan and former National Policy Advisor to the President of the Taiwan. Admiral Ko Tun-hwa graduated in 1957 with the first class of the Naval Command Course, the first course for international officers, at the United States Naval War College.

Awards
 Vice Admiral Ko Tun-hwa was awarded the Silver Star Award from by the International Strategic Studies Association for Outstanding Contributions to Strategic Progress.
Vice Admiral Ko Tun-hwawas was awarded the Stefan T. Possony Prize.

References

External links
Vice Admiral Ko Tun-hwa was awarded the Silver Star Award from by the International Strategic Studies Association 

1921 births
2010 deaths
Taiwanese Ministers of National Defense
Naval War College alumni
Politicians from Fuzhou
Republic of China politicians from Fujian
Chinese Civil War refugees
Generals from Fujian
Taiwanese people from Fujian
Taiwanese expatriates in the United States